The Caesars Palace Grand Prix was a car race held in Las Vegas between 1981 and 1984. For the first two years, the race was part of the Formula One World Championship, before becoming a round of the CART series in 1983. Nissan/Datsun was a presenting sponsor of both races. The temporary motor circuit used for the event is commonly referred to as the "Caesars Palace car park" by the media, as a result of its location.

History 

There had been Can-Am races at the Stardust International Raceway in the mid to late 1960s, but that circuit was bought by developers and then demolished in 1970. The first race was originally supposed to take place as the last race of the 1980 season on November 2, 4 weeks after the US Grand Prix at Watkins Glen. But when Watkins Glen went off the schedule after 1980, the Caesars' Palace Grand Prix gained importance, and more effort was put forth by Bernie Ecclestone and others to make sure this Las Vegas race went ahead. But Las Vegas was not as popular among the drivers  as Long Beach, primarily because of its flat, repetitive nature of the circuit, its parking-lot location and Las Vegas itself. It has also been described as one of the worst circuits Formula One has ever visited.

The track was laid out in the parking lot of the Caesars Palace hotel and was set up for a temporary circuit. Wide enough for overtaking, it provided ample run-off areas filled with sand and had a surface that was as smooth as glass. Its counter-clockwise direction, however, put a tremendous strain on the drivers' necks. When Nelson Piquet clinched his first World Championship by finishing fifth in 1981, it took him 15 minutes to recover from heat exhaustion after barely making it to the finish. The 1982 race, held in intense heat — another unpleasant feature of this race — was won by Michele Alboreto in a Tyrrell, but that was the end of Formula One racing in Las Vegas, since the races had drawn only tiny crowds and the 1981 race turned out to be a huge loss for the hotel.

Following the withdrawal of Formula One, the event was assumed by CART for 1983 and 1984. The circuit was modified with turns 1, 6, and 10 connected in a continuous straight, producing a flat  distorted oval. For the 1984 running, the exit of the final corner was widened, increasing lap speeds by around 7 mph from the previous year. Following the 1984 race, the circuit disappeared from the calendar, with the location now covered with urban development (namely, the Forum Shops at Caesars and the Mirage).

Formula One is due to return to Las Vegas in November 2023, with the Las Vegas Grand Prix forming part of the 2023 World Championship.

Winners of the Caesars Palace Grand Prix 
A pink background indicates an event which was not part of the Formula One World Championship.

Lap records 
The official race lap records at the Caesars Palace Grand Prix are listed as:

See also
 List of Formula One Grands Prix
 United States Grand Prix
 Dallas Grand Prix
 Detroit Grand Prix
 United States Grand Prix West
 Grand Prix of America (proposed, never held)
 Las Vegas Grand Prix

References

External links
F1 Rejects article

 
Formula One Grands Prix
Defunct motorsport venues in the United States
1981 establishments in Nevada
Recurring sporting events established in 1981
Recurring sporting events disestablished in 1984